The men's tumbling event was part of the gymnastics program at the 1932 Summer Olympics. It was contested for the only time at the Olympics. The competition was held on Wednesday, August 10, 1932. Four gymnasts from two nations competed.

Medalists

Results

Two exercises were contested with the results based on total points.

References

External links
 Olympic Report
 

Tumbling